Sigra is an urban locality in the city of Varanasi, Uttar Pradesh, India. The residence of the Mayor of Varanasi is also located in Ghanti Mill Road of Sigra.

Facilities
The famous 10,000 seater Dr Sampurnanda Stadium, used mostly for cricket, is situated in Sigra.

References

Cities and towns in Varanasi district